Lo Mejor de Marta Sánchez (eng.: The Best of Marta Sanchez) is the second compilation album released by the Spanish singer Marta Sánchez. Was released on 1 March 2005. The album included three new tracks: "Sepárate", "Caradura" and "Profundo Valor", which were promoted as singles. Also the singer included on this album a reworked version of her hit-single "Soldados del Amor" previously recorded with her group Olé Olé.

Track listing

 Sepárate (Eva Manzano/Marta Sánchez/Carlos Jean) — 3:08	
 Profundo Valor (Claudio Silvestri/Piero Cassano/Marta Sanchez) — 3:35	
 Caradura (Eva Manzano/Marta Sanchez/Carlos Jean) — 3:08	
 Despesperada 2004 — 3:39 (Original version on the album Mujer)
 Soldados del Amor 2004 — 4:52	
 Soy Yo (From the album Soy Yo — 4:00
 Sigo Intentando (From the album Soy Yo) — 3:57
 No Te Quiero Más (From the album Soy Yo) — 4:13
 Desconocida (From the album Desconocida) — 4:38
 Quiero Más de Ti (From the album Desconocida) — 3:26
 Y Sin Embargo Te Quiero (From the compilation album Tatuaje) — 4:31
 Moja mi corazón (From the album Azabache) — 4:56	
 Amor Perdido (From the album Azabache) — 4:11
 La Belleza (From the album Mi Mundo) — 3:32	
 Arena y Sol (From the album Mi Mundo) — 3:16	
 Dime la Verdad (From the album Mi Mundo) — 4:09	
 De Mujer a Mujer (From the album Mujer) — 4:31

References

Marta Sánchez albums
2005 greatest hits albums